Lelaps striaticeps is a species of Hymenoptera in the  family Pteromalidae. The scientific name of this species was first published 1911 by Strand.

References

Pteromalidae